Amine Belaïd (born April 5, 1988) is an Algerian football player. He plays for MC Alger in the Algerian Ligue Professionnelle 1.

Club career
On July 17, 2011, Belaïd signed a two-year contract with MC Alger. On August 12, 2011, Belaïd made his MC Alger debut as a starter in a 2011 CAF Champions League group stage match against Al-Ahly. He played the entire match as MC Alger went on to lose 2–0.

References

External links
DZFoot Profile

1988 births
Living people
Algerian footballers
Algerian Ligue Professionnelle 1 players
Algerian Ligue 2 players
MC Alger players
USM Bel Abbès players
Association football defenders
21st-century Algerian people